The Mulhouse Scorpions is a French ice hockey team in Mulhouse that operates from 1997. In 2001, the club was promoted to the Ligue Magnus. They won the Ligue Magnus in 2005, and folded after that season.

Notable players
 Richard Aimonetto
 Juraj Faith
 Alexander Kuzminski
 Fabrice Lhenry
 Steve Montador
 Jukka Ollila
 Miroslav Pažák
 Steven Reinprecht
 Luc Tardif Jr.

External links
HC Mulhouse on eurohockey.net

Ice hockey teams in France
Ice hockey clubs established in 1997
Sports clubs disestablished in 2005
Sport in Mulhouse